Mordaunt is a surname and a given name.

It may also refer to:

Viscount Mordaunt - see Earl of Peterborough for the two holders of the title
Baron Mordaunt, a title in the Peerage of England
Mordaunt baronets, a title in the Baronetage of England
, 17th century Royal Navy ship of the line

See also

 
Mordaunt-Short, a UK loudspeaker manufacturer founded by Norman Mordaunt and Rodney Short
Mordant (disambiguation)
Mordent